Chrysiptera cyanea is a species of damselfish found in the wide Indo-West Pacific but not known in the Red Sea. A few individuals were observed in the Mediterranean Sea in 2013 off Slovenia, a likely aquarium release. 

Common names include blue damselfish, blue demoiselle, blue devil, cornflower sergeant-major,  Hedley's damselfish, red tail Australian damsel, sapphire devil, and sky-blue damsel.

Description
This fish reaches 8.5 centimeters in length. It is bright blue in color; the male has a yellow snout and tail, and the female and juvenile usually lack yellow but have a black spot at the base of the back edge of the dorsal fin.

Behavior
The fish inhabits reefs and lagoons. Its diet includes algae, tunicates, and copepods. Male and female pair up for breeding, and the male guards and tends the eggs.

In aquarium
It is very aggressive. A matched couple often attacks any same size fish approaching its breeding territory.

References

External links
 

cyanea
Fish described in 1825